Frank Allen "Zaz" Zazula (July 4, 1916 – December 12, 1999) was an American football, track and field, and cross country coach. He served as the head football coach at the University of North Dakota from 1950 to 1956, compiling a record of 28–27–3. Zazula also coached track and field and cross country at North Dakota until 1982.

Zazula grew up in Canton Ohio, and played high school football as a quarterback at Canton McKinley High School. He then starred in football at the University of Akron, lettering from 1937 to 1939. Zazula died on December 12, 1999.

Head coaching record

Football

References

External links
 

1916 births
1999 deaths
American football halfbacks
American football quarterbacks
Akron Zips football coaches
Akron Zips football players
North Dakota Fighting Hawks football coaches
Oregon Ducks football coaches
College cross country coaches in the United States
College track and field coaches in the United States
Sportspeople from Passaic, New Jersey
Sportspeople from Canton, Ohio
Players of American football from Canton, Ohio